Robbie Thomas Kruse (born 5 October 1988) is an Australian professional footballer who plays as a forward for Brisbane Roar and formerly played for the Australia national team. He played his junior football with Albany Creek in the Pine Rivers district to the near north of Brisbane and began his professional career with A-League side Brisbane Roar and later Melbourne Victory before moving to Germany in 2011.

Club career

Brisbane Roar
Recruited in 2006 by Miron Bleiberg, Kruse was injured during an otherwise successful A-League pre-season during training. He scored on his debut against Wellington Phoenix on 5 October 2007, his nineteenth birthday, with what was to be the winning goal for that game.

On 19 October 2007, Kruse struck against the Newcastle Jets for his second goal of his A-League career. On 16 November, he got his third with an excellent curling effort to the far post as Brisbane beat Melbourne 1–0.

Kruse and his close friend Michael Zullo formed a good partnership with each playing either side of a striker in a three-man attack for Brisbane which coincided with a seven match unbeaten streak.

Kruse's place in Roar's starting line-up was in jeopardy at the beginning of the 2008 A-League season after he was involved in an altercation outside a Queensland nightspot. The fight resulted in Kruse needing stitches and the then-19-year-old incurring the wrath of club coach Frank Farina, who offered Kruse only a short term contract as a replacement for the injured Massimo Murdoca for the 2009–10 season.

Melbourne Victory
Kruse was linked to a move to reigning A-League premiers Melbourne Victory following the departure of Melbourne striker Danny Allsopp to Qatar club Al-Rayyan. On 10 September 2009, it was confirmed that Kruse had left the Roar for Melbourne Victory.

Kruse made his first appearance for the Victory on 13 September 2009 against Wellington Phoenix after replacing Ney Fabiano at the 58th minute. He scored his first goal for the Victory in the 4–0 demolition of Gold Coast United on 28 November 2009.

A highlight of Kruse's professional career was when he scored a first half hat-trick on 16 January 2010 against the Perth Glory. The Victory went on to win 6–2 as the Glory had no answer for Kruse's pace and well timed runs. His fifth goal came against Sydney FC in the major semi final when struck a curling shot which left Sydney FC keeper Clint Bolton no chance as it tore into the top right corner. His sixth goal for Melbourne came against Gold Coast United when he rounded goalkeeper and former teammate Glen Moss to slide the ball into the open net.

He was the first player to score a brace in a Melbourne derby, helping Victory to a 3–1 win over their rivals Melbourne Heart in December 2010.

At Victory, Kruse was known for turning his career around through his development and change of attitude, no longer getting caught up in off-field incidents like he did whilst in Brisbane, and taking his footballing potential much more seriously.

Fortuna Düsseldorf

Following his form for the Victory, Kruse signed with German side Fortuna Düsseldorf on a three-year contract beginning with the 2011–12 season. He made his competitive debut for the club on 24 July 2011 in a league match against SC Paderborn 07, making a substitute appearance in the second half.
Kruse started in Fortuna's return to the Bundesliga in the 2012–13 season. He provided a flick on for Schahin leading to the first goal and a neat cross for Schahin's second. Fortuna went on to win the match 2–0 over Augsburg.
He scored his first goal in the Bundesliga against Hoffenheim. In the 2–0 win over Hamburger SV, he scored his second goal of the Bundesliga campaign and then provided the assist for Fortuna's second.

Bayer Leverkusen

Kruse signed a three-year contract with German side Bayer Leverkusen for €1.5 million on 28 April 2013. He made his run-on debut against Mainz 05 in the Bundesliga on 21 September 2013, scoring two goals in a 4–1 victory.

Loan to VfB Stuttgart
On 31 August 2015, Kruse signed with VfB Stuttgart on loan until the end of the season with an option to buy. He made his first appearance for VfB Stuttgart in the away match against Hertha BSC on 11 September 2015, as a replacement for Martin Harnik early in the second half. The loan deal was prematurely terminated on 1 February 2016.

Liaoning Whowin
In May 2017, Kruse terminated his contract with Liaoning Whowin due to unpaid wages.

VfL Bochum
On 21 July 2017, Kruse joined German club VfL Bochum. He scored his debut goal for the club on 10 September 2017, netting the winning goal in a 2–1 victory over Darmstadt 98.

Return to Melbourne Victory
In July 2019, Kruse returned to the A-League, signing a two-year contract with Melbourne Victory.

Kruse was named as the Victory Medalist for the 2020–21 season; he made 19 appearances but no goals and one assist in that season.

Kruse left the Victory in June 2022 upon the expiration of his contract.

Return to Brisbane Roar 
In February 2023, Brisbane Roar announced that Robbie Kruse would be returning to the club for the 2023 A-League season.

International career

On 28 December 2010, following his impressive level of play in the A-League Kruse was selected in the Australian national team's 23-man squad for the 2011 Asian Cup. On 5 January 2011, he made his Socceroos debut, coming off the bench against UAE in a pre-Asian Cup friendly match. On 25 January 2011, Kruse scored his first international goal, in a 6–0 victory over Uzbekistan in the semi final of the 2011 AFC Asian Cup. In the final of the competition, he made a substitute appearance and almost scored a header with his first touch of the ball. Australia lost the final 1–0 in extra time.

Kruse scored his second international goal in a friendly match against Wales on 10 August 2011, which Australia won 2–1. He scored his third goal against Jordan on 11 June 2013, in a 2014 World Cup qualifier in which Australia won 4–0, and in which he was also Man of the Match, with two more assists on top of his goal. He missed out on a spot in the team for the 2014 FIFA World Cup with an injury.

Kruse was named as part of Australia's 2015 AFC Asian Cup squad. He made his first appearance of the tournament as a starter in Australia's first group game against Kuwait. He started Australia's second group game against Oman, scoring Australia's second goal of the game off a Massimo Luongo assist, in an eventual 4–0 win, with him being named man of the match in the same match.

Kruse started in the 2015 AFC Asian Cup Final. However, in the middle of the second half, he suffered an Achilles injury and was substituted off for James Troisi. Australia went on to win the match 2–1 with the match-winning goal coming through Troisi. Scans revealed that although Kruse's injury was not as serious as initially feared, he would still spend four months on the sidelines.

In May 2018, he was named in Australia's 23-man squad for the 2018 FIFA World Cup in Russia.

Career statistics

Club

International

Scores and results list Australia's goal tally first, score column indicates score after each Kruse goal.

Honours
Australia
 AFC Asian Cup: 2015

Individual
 Melbourne Victory Young Player of the Year: 2009–10, 2010–11
 A-League PFA Team of the Season: 2010–11
 Harry Kewell Medal: 2012–13
 PFA Footballer of the Year: 2012–13

References

External links

 Aussie Footballers Kowalski to Kyriazopoulos 
 
 

Living people
1988 births
Australian people of German descent
Australian soccer players
Association football forwards
Australia international soccer players
AFC Asian Cup-winning players
2011 AFC Asian Cup players
2015 AFC Asian Cup players
2017 FIFA Confederations Cup players
2018 FIFA World Cup players
2019 AFC Asian Cup players
Brisbane Roar FC players
Melbourne Victory FC players
Fortuna Düsseldorf players
Bayer 04 Leverkusen players
VfB Stuttgart players
Liaoning F.C. players
VfL Bochum players
A-League Men players
Bundesliga players
2. Bundesliga players
Chinese Super League players
Australian Institute of Sport soccer players
Australian expatriate soccer players
Australian expatriate sportspeople in Germany
Expatriate footballers in Germany
Australian expatriate sportspeople in China
Expatriate footballers in China
Soccer players from Brisbane
Marquee players (A-League Men)